Sir Paul Douglas Nicholson,  (born 7 March 1938) is an English industrialist and was Lord Lieutenant of County Durham from 1997 to 2013.

Nicholson was born in County Durham and educated at Ludgrove School, Harrow School and Clare College, Cambridge. Between Harrow and Cambridge, he was commissioned during National Service in The Coldstream Guards. After qualifying as a Chartered Accountant, he joined Vaux Breweries in 1965 and, from 1976 until 1999, he was Chairman of the Vaux Group, one of the most successful companies in the North East of England.

He was Chairman of the Tyne and Wear Development Corporation throughout its existence (1987-1998) and also served  as Chairman of the Northern Region of CBI (1977–1979), Chairman of the Brewers and Licensed Retailers Association, formerly the Brewers Society (1994–1996), and in 1995 he became the inaugural President of the Northeast Chamber of Commerce. He was Knighted in 1993 for 'Services to Industry and the Public in Northeast England'. He was appointed a Knight Commander of the Royal Victorian Order (KCVO) in 2011

In his youth he was a prominent amateur rider twice winning the Liverpool Foxhunters steeplechase in 1963 and 1965. Later he was President of the Coaching Club (1990–1997).

In 1980 he was appointed High Sheriff of Durham and Lord Lieutenant in 1997.  He has published an autobiography entitled "Brewer at Bay published by The Memoir Club".

Nicholson is married to Sarah Bacon, daughter of Sir Edmund Bacon, 13th and 14th Baronet, the premier baronet in the United Kingdom.  They have one daughter, Lucy (b. 1972).

Already a Knight Bachelor, Nicholson was appointed Knight Commander of the Royal Victorian Order (KCVO) in the 2011 Birthday Honours.

Honours and awards

References 

1938 births
Living people
People from County Durham
Alumni of Clare College, Cambridge
Coldstream Guards officers
Lord-Lieutenants of Durham
People educated at Harrow School
High Sheriffs of Durham
Knights Bachelor
Knights Commander of the Royal Victorian Order
People educated at Ludgrove School